William Andrew Paton is an American former tennis player of the 1940s and 1950s.

Paton, a native of Michigan, took the name of his father, noted accountancy scholar William Andrew Paton.

A collegiate player for the University of Michigan, Paton's tour performances include a Western Indoor Championship title win in 1949 and two singles third round appearances at the U.S. National Championships. In 1954 he reached the second round of the Wimbledon Championships, where he took the 10th seeded Kurt Nielsen to five sets.

References

External links
 

Year of birth missing (living people)
Living people
American male tennis players
Michigan Wolverines men's tennis players
Tennis people from Michigan
20th-century American people